The Solvay Brussels School of Economics and Management (abbreviated as SBS-EM and also known as simply Solvay) is a school of economics and management and a Faculty of the Université libre de Bruxelles (ULB), a French-speaking private research university located in Brussels, Belgium. Business education started in 1899, and Solvay was established in 1903 through a donation from the industrialist Ernest Solvay.

Overview

The roots of the Solvay School stretch back to the founding of the Department of Economics of the Free University of Brussels in 1899, and the founding of the Solvay Business School in 1903. Ernest Solvay founded and funded a business-oriented institution under the name of École de Commerce Solvay, as a private initiative established with the support of the Brussels business community.

The Solvay Brussels School of Economics and Management was established in 2008 as a result of the merger of the Department of Economics and the Solvay Business School. In 2010, the new entity built a new building on the Solbosch campus and became a full faculty of the Université libre de Bruxelles (ULB). More than 3,700 students attend some thirty programmes at the School today. Since 2018, its current Dean is Philip Vergauwen, former Dean of the University of Maastricht's School of Business and Economics.

Campus

The school is located in the Ixelles neighborhood of Brussels on the Solbosch, the central and largest campus of the Université libre de Bruxelles (ULB). The main building is situated on the corner of the Avenue Franklin Roosevelt/Franklin Rooseveltlaan and the Avenue Jeanne/Johannalaan near the Bois de la Cambre/Ter Kamerenbos, and was built in 2010.

Academics

Programmes
The school grants academic undergraduate degrees (Bachelor of Science), academic master's degrees (Master of Science), advanced master's degrees (pre-experience) and professional/executive master's degrees (post-experience), including more than thirty Executive Education programmes.

Undergraduate B.Sc. programmes
 B.Sc. in Business Engineering (French only)
 B.Sc. in Economics (French only)

Graduate M.Sc. programmes
Solvay currently offers six separate Master's of Science degrees in:
 M.Sc. in Business Engineering (partly French and English)
 M.Sc. in Management Science (English only)
 M.Sc. in Economics: Business Economics (partly French and English)
 M.Sc. in Economics: Economic Analysis and European Policy (partly French and English)
 M.Sc. in Economics: Economic Research (English only)
 M.Sc. in Economics: Didactics – Teaching

Solvay also offers two complementary Master's of Science degrees (MCC: Master complémentaire conjoint) in:
 M.Sc. in Management
 M.Sc. in Microfinance

Postgraduate programmes (pre-experience)
 Masters in Finance: 
 Advanced Master in Financial Markets
 Advanced Master in Quantitative Finance
 Masters in Management:
 Advanced Master in Innovation and Entrepreneurship (in partnership with MIP Politecnico di Milano)
 Advanced Master in Innovation and Strategic Management
 Masters in Marketing:
 Advanced Master in Creativity and Marketing
 Masters in Economy:
 Advanced Master in Political Economy

Professional/executive programmes (post-experience)
 Executive master's programmes
 Executive MBA
 Executive Master in Finance
 Executive Mastère en Gestion Fiscale (French-only)
 Executive Master in Management
 Executive Master in Marketing, in a digital world
 Executive Master in IT Management
 Executive Master in Information Risk and Cybersecurity
 Executive Mastère en Management des Institutions de Santé et de Soins (French-only)
 Executive Master in International Association Management
 Executive Master in Knowledge and Technology Transfer
 Executive education programmes

Doctoral programmes
 PhD in Economics (Economics and Statistics & Quantitative Economics)
 PhD in Management (Management & Applied Economics)

Partners
The Solvay Brussels School of Economics and Management has developed a network of more than 70 partners in 32 countries, with whom some 160 student exchanges are organised each year. The School is the only in Belgium that requires students to undertake a six-month exchange programme in a university abroad. Such exchanges take place principally in Europe, within the framework of the SOCRATES and ERASMUS programmes, but also in the United States, Canada, Turkmenistan,   Mexico, Peru, Argentina, Egypt, Israel, South Africa, India (IIM Ahmedabad), Korea, Japan, Thailand, Vietnam, China, Taiwan and Singapore.

 Argentina:
 Universidad de San Andrés
 Canada:
 Goodman School of Business, Brock University
 Carleton University
 HEC Montréal
 McGill University
 Sauder School of Business, University of British Columbia
 University of Lethbridge
 China:
 Peking University HSBC Business School
 Mexico:
 Tecnológico de Monterrey
 Peru:
 Universidad del Pacifico
 United States
 Darden Graduate School of Business Administration, University of Virginia
 Fox School of Business, Temple University

Rankings and accreditations
 Financial Times 2016: 45st MSc in Management (Europe)

Research
The Solvay Brussels School of Economics and Management is a research-based institution, in two respects. First, the duty of all core faculty members includes the production of scientific output (e.g. publications in peer-review international journals and scientific conferences) and the supervision of PhD candidates. Second, the SBS-EM provides an infrastructure for research, through its three main research centres, the CEB (Centre Emile Bernheim), DULBEA (Department in Applied Economics of ULB), and ECARES (European Centre for Advanced Research in Economics and Statistics), and their doctoral schools. Over the past 5 years, many publications have been produced, including 241 articles in international scientific journals and 41 books.

The CEB, ECARES and DULBEA are the main, 'broad-based', research centers affiliated to the SBS-EM. The two additional thematic research centers are CERMi (Centre Européen de Recherche en Microfinance / Center for European Research in Microfinance), and the Centre for Knowledge Economics (Centre de l'économie de la connaissance).

Affiliated to the SBS-EM, CEB is its research institute in management sciences. It aims to develop and promote advanced scientific research in management sciences. The centre hosts more than 75 (full-time and part-time) professors and researchers in key management disciplines. The CEB's teaching and research staff is currently active in the following management fields: accounting, marketing, business strategy, financial markets, corporate management, industrial economics, management of innovation and international trade.

DULBEA was founded by Etienne Sadi Kirschen in the 1950s, based on the new developments taking place in economics and the theory of econometrics. The DULBEA also gives prominence to recommendations in the field of economic policy.

ECARES, founded in 1991, began as a joint political initiative of the ULB Institute of European Studies and the Centre for Economic Policy Research (CEPR), a network of some 500 researchers in Europe.

CERMi (Centre Européen de Recherche en Microfinance / Center for European Research in Microfinance), draws together researchers, involved in microfinance activities in developing countries, from CEB and from the Research Centre Warocque (Université Mons-Hainaut). The CERMi also collabores with the European Microfinance Programme.

Centre for Knowledge Economics research centre allows the School to bring together all its researchers on a topic. Founded and chaired by Professor Francoise Thys-Clément and Professor of Public Economics.

Student life
The Solvay Brussels School of Economics and Management has an active student life, complementary to the student societies of the Université Libre de Bruxelles: 
 Cercle Solvay, the student society of economics
 Bureau Etudiant Solvay, the student government
 Solvay Business Game, the business game
 High School Challenge
 Solvay Mentoring Program
 Solvay Consulting Club
 Solvay Finance Club

Solvay Finance Club
One of the youngest organisations is the Solvay Brussels School Student Finance Club, created in 2010. It is a student run organization that aims to offer its members a wide variety of finance related activities, whether it is investment banking, investment management, venture capital/private equity, or corporate finance. The founders' idea was to create a club that prepares its members for careers in the financial field by fostering an environment that helps them to translate their theoretical knowledge into practice, and that stimulates continuous learning and awareness of recent trends and developments. The club offers those pursuing careers in finance a professional and social network. It constitutes an interface between the finance industry and its members.

Solvay Consulting Club
In 2011, the SBS Student Consulting Club (SCC) was created. Its mission statement is: "The SCC conducts customized consulting services to deliver hands on solutions. It believes in cultivating integer people who drive entrepreneurship in all businesses and strive to functionally develop committed students."
The organization is growing rapidly, both in terms of members and in terms of consulting projects conducted. It won the JADE Belgium Junior Enterprise Challenge in 2012.

The club aims at becoming a Junior Enterprise, which is a certified label by JADE.

ESTIEM
Besides the programs developed by the school, students also have the opportunity to take part in ESTIEM activities via the Local Group Brussels, part of Cercle Solvay. ESTIEM is the organisation for European Students of Industrial Engineering and Management, whose goal is to establish and foster relations between students across Europe and to support them in their personal and professional development, with a network consisting of 74 local groups in 28 countries, reaching out to 60,000 students.

People

Faculty
 Paul Bairoch, economic historian
 Mathias Dewatripont, economist and member of the board of directors of the National Bank of Belgium
 , economist and sociologist
 André Farber, business engineer and mathematician, former president of the European Finance Association
 Victor Ginsburgh, economist
 , economist
 , economic historian
 Peter Praet, member of the board of the European Central Bank and former Director of the National Bank of Belgium
 Gérard Roland, former professor at the Free University of Brussels and now professor at University of California, Berkeley
 André Sapir, economist and supervisor of the Sapir Report
 , economist and former rector of the ULB
 , economist
 Bruno van Pottelsberghe, economist and former Chief Economist of the European Patent Office

Alumni
The alumni network currently has a community of more than 20,000 members in more than 65 countries worldwide. The Solvay Alumni is the association that represents all graduates from the Solvay Brussels School of Economics and Management or one of its satellite institutions. Within the particular context of Belgium, a country marked in the past by religious and ideological rifts, alumni associations play an extremely important role, especially for the universities.

Notable alumni include the following:

Banking and financial services
 , CEO of Degroof Petercam, former CEO of NYSE Euronext
 Stephane De Baets, founder of international asset management firm Elevated Returns and pioneer in blockchain-based real estate investing

 , former CEO of Pertcam, chairman of the Fondation ULB
 Pierre Lagrange, partner and co-founder of GLG Partners
 Dominique Leroy, CEO of Proximus Group
 François Narmon, former CEO of Dexia, former president of the Belgian Olympic Committee

 , CEO of Compagnie Nationale à Portefeuille or CNP

General management

 Didier Bellens, former CEO of Belgacom, former CEO of the Groupe Bruxelles Lambert

 Alain Deneef, Belgian businessman
 Paul Deneve, Vice-President of Apple, former CEO of Yves Saint Laurent

 Christian Jourquin, former CEO of Solvay
 Dominique Leroy, CEO of Belgacom
 Alexandre Vandamme, Belgian businessman and board member of Inbev

Government / public service / non-profit
 Hubert Ansiaux, governor of the National Bank of Belgium (1957–1971)
 Rik Daems, politician
 , former President of the Belgian Banking, Finance and Insurance Commission (CBFA)
 , Minister for National Recovery (1947–1949)
 Lodewijk De Raet, economist and politician
 Maurice Frère, governor of the National Bank of Belgium (1944–1957)
 Camille Gutt, Head of the International Monetary Fund
 Jean-Paul Harroy, Governor of Ruanda-Urundi
 , Belgian politician, former Minister
 
 Roberto Lavagna, former Minister of Economy and Production of Argentina
 Amer Husni Lutfi, former Syrian Minister of Economy
 , former Belgian Minister of Economy
 Eliane Tillieux, Belgian Minister of Health
 Michel van den Abeele, former Director-General of the European Commission, Director-General of Eurostat and Permanent Representative of the European Commission to the OCDE and UNESCO

Academics
 Marianne Bertrand, Professor of Economics at the University of Chicago
 Claude Javeau, Professor of sociology
 , economist, professor at ULB and former president of the Conseil central de l'Économie

Sports
 Paul Frère, Belgian Racing driver and journalist
 Claire Michel, Belgian professional triathlete and Olympian

Entertainment
 Anthony Asael, Belgian photographer and explorer
 , CEO of RTL Group, former CEO of ProSiebenSat.1
 Jean-Paul Philippot, CEO of French-speaking public broadcast company RTBF
 Philippe Swan, Belgian singer and songwriter
 Jean Van Hamme, writer
 Alex Vizorek, humorist and actor

References

External links 

 

Business schools in Belgium
Universities in Belgium
Vrije Universiteit Brussel
Educational institutions established in 1903
Université libre de Bruxelles
Universities and colleges formed by merger in Belgium
1903 establishments in Belgium